The Arrondissement of Hasselt is one of the three administrative arrondissements in the Province of Limburg, Belgium.

It is both an administrative and a judicial arrondissement. However, the Judicial Arrondissement of Hasselt also comprises the municipalities of Lommel, Hamont-Achel, Neerpelt, Overpelt, Hechtel-Eksel, Peer and Houthalen-Helchteren in the Arrondissement of Maaseik.

Municipalities

The Administrative Arrondissement of Hasselt consists of the following municipalities:

 As
 Beringen
 Diepenbeek
 Genk
 Gingelom
 Halen
 Ham
 Hasselt
 Herk-de-Stad

 Heusden-Zolder
 Leopoldsburg
 Lummen
 Nieuwerkerken
 Sint-Truiden
 Tessenderlo
 Zonhoven
 Zutendaal

Per 1 January 2019, the municipality of Opglabbeek was removed from this arrondissement, as it was merged with Meeuwen-Gruitrode into the new municipality of Oudsbergen in the arrondissement of Maaseik.

References

Hasselt